The round-eared elephant shrew (Macroscelides proboscideus) or round-eared sengi (called the Karoo round-eared elephant shrew to distinguish it from its sister species; formerly misleadingly named the "short-eared elephant shrew"), is a species of elephant shrew (sengi) in the family Macroscelididae. It is found in Botswana, Namibia, and South Africa. Its natural habitats are subtropical or tropical dry shrubland, and grassland, and hot deserts. They eat insects, shoots, and roots. Their gestation period is 56 days.

Elephant shrews are among only a handful of monogamous mammals, making them a model group for the study of monogamy. They have been studied for their mate guarding behavior. Mate guarding is considered a predominant male trait in round-eared elephant shrews. This strategy is used to guard the female before and after heat to eliminate male competition, which makes male round-eared elephant shrews monogamous and more vulnerable to their surroundings as they spent a majority of their time dedicated to this tactic. 

Research was recently conducted to determine that elephant shrews are thought to have dichromatic color vision due to their ability to differentiate between blue/green colors and grey. However, there is no evidence to prove that the species can see red colors.

Habitat 
The round-eared elephant shrew are native to Southeast Africa where the temperature ranges from 18°C to 6°C in the winter and 30°C to 22°C during the summer.

Foraging and Diet 
Round Eared elephant Shrew are omnivores with their diet mainly consisting of insects and supplemented with plants. During the winter this species consumes less insects than they do during the summer due to a decrease in the insect population.

Reproduction and Life Cycles 
The round-eared elephant shrew do not reproduce during the winter.

References

External links

Photos at Biolib.cz

Mammals described in 1800
Elephant shrews
Mammals of Southern Africa
Taxonomy articles created by Polbot